Noah's Island is a British animated television series for children made by the creators of The Animals of Farthing Wood and commissioned by the European Broadcasting Union. It was directed by Emile Bourget, Philippe LeClerc, Alan Simpson, and Frederic Trouillot, with the episodes written by Steve Walker. Each of the 39 episodes ran for 28 minutes. Although not as successful as Farthing Wood, it was fairly popular on Saturday mornings in many British households, particularly with its younger demographic. Inspired by the Bible story Noah's Ark, the series was praised for its characterization, imaginative storylines and for introducing ecological themes.

Plot
The series focused on the adventures of a community of animals on a floating island that was originally part of the Canadian Coastline before being struck by a flaming meteorite. Their leader is a polar bear named Noah, and the community includes a pair of woolly mammoths called Salomi and Mammothsbody, as well as a group of animals from a closed down zoo who survived the sinking of a cargo ship. The Island is able to float because of a core of molten magma called the 'Fire-Bowl', which was formed from the meteorite. Noah uses the Fire-Bowl to steer the Island across the ocean, following a map that Salomi's father drew that leads to Diamantina, an uncharted island in the Indian Ocean where the animals can be safe from humans. During their quest, Noah and the community pass by several continents, rescuing animals in peril wherever they go.

Characters
 Noah – the series' main protagonist. Noah is a male polar bear who discovers the floating island whilst adrift on an ice floe in the North Atlantic Ocean, and is eventually elected as the island's captain because of his strong leadership skills. He is eccentric yet ambitious, and his main goal in life is to turn the floating island into a safe haven for all animals.
 Mammothsbody and Salomi – two elderly woolly mammoths who were frozen in Arctic ice during the ice age, but are thawed out by the heat of the meteorite forming the Fire-Bowl. Mammothsbody is slow and simple-minded, while Salomi is more strong-willed, shrewd and aggressive. A recurring joke in the first series is Mammothsbody constantly proposing marriage to Salomi, but she always rejects him. The mammoths eventually marry at the end of the first series, but Salomi continues to talk down to Mammothsbody despite their marriage.
 Sparky – a male white rabbit who never speaks, communicating instead through hand gestures and facial expressions. His small size and lack of strength are often played for comedic effect, and a recurring joke throughout the series is a larger animal falling down and accidentally "crushing" him.
 The Vulture Patrol – a flock of vultures who serve as airborne scouts, often sent to investigate an island or coastline Noah's island approaches. The original group consisted of an elderly, senile vulture named The Squadron Leader, and his two daughters Shirley and Mildred. They are later joined by "Him", a male vulture who is handsome and strong, yet dim-witted. "Him" and Shirley eventually become mates and have a chick together, who is referred to as "Baby Chick Bird".

Zoo animals
 Rocco – a brash but virtuous male gorilla who serves as the island's "Chief Surgeon", having acquired basic medical knowledge from observing the zoo's vets. Rocco's main character arc in the series is grieving for his mate Hetty, who died when the cargo ship sank, but eventually starting a relationship with another gorilla named Gertie.
 Woomera – a female red kangaroo who works with Rocco in the island's infirmary. While often caring and kind-hearted, she is prone to stubbornness in difficult situations, and regularly argues with the more reckless Rocco.
 Nab – an anxious but well-meaning male orangutan who speaks in a stereotypical Scottish accent and watches over the island's Fire-Bowl (the core of molten magma that causes the island to float), referring to himself as the "Chief Engineer".
 Jasper – a male proboscis monkey who assists Nab in the Fire-Bowl chamber. Like Sparky, Jasper never speaks, communicating instead through monkey sounds that are translated by whoever he is speaking to. Despite being a proboscis monkey, Jasper is always referred to as a "gibbon" by other characters.
 The Valve Rhino – a simple-minded male rhinoceros who works with Nab and Jasper in the Fire-Bowl chamber, using his great strength to push the Fire-Bowl's valve systems. Despite usually being calm and non-confrontational, the rhino is prone to outbursts of violent anger when others voice their annoyance with his habit to say 'Pom-pom-pom-piddle-pom-pom'.
 Reg – an arrogant male mandrill who longs to be human, often trying to do "human" things such as walking on two legs and reading books, though he is illiterate and can only look at the pictures. He is good friends with Rocco, but never shows much consideration towards anyone else, and regards himself as superior to the other animals for being "almost human". Early in the first series, Reg is portrayed as a rogue, but as the series progresses he becomes more of a comic relief character.
 Ursula – a female Eurasian brown bear who speaks in a stereotypical Welsh accent. She is a self-centred gossip, and shows little to no regard towards others. However, despite being a different species of bear she has romantic feelings for Noah.
 Chang – a soft-spoken and timid female giant panda. She is close friends with Ursula and is usually by her side, but they frequently argue about trivial things and rarely agree on anything. Chang also knows how to perform hypnosis to sedate Rocco's patients, but she lacks true skill and often fails to hypnotise someone properly.
 The Problem Walrus – a laid-back male walrus who spends much of his time lounging on the island's beach, but also offers a counselling service, listening to the personal problems of other characters and offering philosophical guidance and advice.
 Tabby and Ena – a pair of female hyenas who act as Reg's bodyguards. During the first series, both give birth to one mischievous pup each, which are the first babies to be born on the floating island. However, the father of the pups drowned when the cargo ship sank, and never appears in the series.
 Carmen – an awkward female aardvark who is very sensitive about her long nose and tongue. She can be very aggressive, but she is usually mannered and well-tempered.
 Agatha – a female giraffe who is something of a snob, looking down on the other animals in more ways than one. Though she is snooty, she always assist with what ever events require skills unique to a giraffe, so overall she's ill-tempered, but still cares.

Rescued animals
 Sacha – a friendly male Russian desman, who always tries to help however he can in difficult situations, with his usual catchphrase of "oiski poiski", despite the other animals seeing him as an annoyance. Before the Vulture Patrol took him to the island, Sacha performed in a circus in Spain, and he dreams of starting his own circus with insects as the stars, going so far as to train a beetle, whom he names "Jeremy", to do tricks.
 Gertie – a female gorilla who was born and raised in captivity. She is rescued by Noah and the Problem Walrus from a cargo plane that crashed on a reef off-shore from the island. At first, Gertie and Rocco don't get on with each other, but they eventually form a relationship and have a daughter together named Tina after Diamantina.
 Wommie – a male wombat who joins the island's community after helping Woomera find a bandicoot in the Australian Outback. He is brave, adventurous, and has little sense of danger, often attempting life-threatening stunts in his efforts to have fun.
 Tusker – a male African elephant calf who is brought to the island by the Vulture Patrol after being separated from his herd in a desert. Tusker's herd, including his 100-year-old Grandfather, arrive on the island shortly afterwards, and are shown to have joined the community. However, after the episode "Search for the Baby Elephant", the herd never appears on screen again, and no explanation is given as to where they are. Tusker continues to appear in later episodes despite this.
 Grandfather Elephant – a 100-year-old male African elephant who gives much wisdom and has much knowledge of ancient Africa. He's the leader of herd of African elephants, but he doesn't show very much on the series. His age catches up with him eventually and he goes out to sea to die. He asks Salomi and Mammothsbody to watch him, along with the baby elephant's mother.
 The Lion – a male African lion with no name who was saved after he was shot by poachers.
 Wowee – a pampered female French Poodle who was travelling with her owners on a boat that washed up on the shores of the island during a storm. Her owners are never found, and she soon joins Reg's gang, becoming one of his fondest admirers and seeing him as the closest thing to a human on the island. She struggles to fit in among the other wild animals because of her domestic upbringing.
 Calanor – a male aye-aye with the ability to hypnotise other animals. At first, he arrives on the island intending to hypnotise and enslave the community and become their ruler. He eventually abandons this plan, but remains on the island. Despite having lived in the forests of Madagascar before arriving on the island, Calanor speaks in a stereotypical French accent.
 Imshee – a male warthog who is an old childhood friend of Rocco's. He takes up residence on Noah's island after Rocco, Noah and Ursula rescue him from an abandoned zoo in East Africa; the same zoo in which Rocco spent his early life.
 The Do-Dah – a male dodo chick who hatched from an ancient egg that was discovered in a cave by Sacha and Carmen. His accent and speech patterns are similar to a stereotypical pirate, using slang such as "Me Hearties". For a time he insists that dodos are not extinct, until he visits Mauritius and an old parakeet explains how humans brought about their extinction.
 Natasha – a female golden mole who Noah and Sacha find in the Arabian Desert. When they first meet, Natasha is infatuated with Sacha, going so far as to propose marriage to him. However, she soon rejects him upon meeting a male of her species (who is never named). Noah brings the moles onto the island to assist in navigation, having heard legends that golden moles are expert navigators, but to his disappointment the moles turn out to be inept at navigation due to their poor eyesight.
 Rita – a hyperactive female baboon who is brought to Diamantina from Africa to be Reg's mate. When Rita first meets Reg, she verbally abuses him and sees him as inferior, but she eventually warms to him and becomes his mate. It is never stated what kind of baboon Rita is, but she appears to be a different species from Reg the mandrill.
 Chip – a head-strong male wallaby who Gertie and Wommie meet in Australia. He is brought to Diamantina to be Woomera's mate, and even though he is a different species and significantly smaller than Woomera, they still become close friends.
 Tallulah – a female rhinoceros who is brought to Diamantina to be a mate for the Valve Rhino. She is much more intelligent, well-spoken and articulate than the Valve Rhino, but they fall in love and become mates despite their differing personalities.
 The Komodo dragon – a frightening-looking but very kind male Komodo dragon.
Other animals which join the community on the island's way to Diamantina include a pangolin, a bandicoot, two three-toed sloths, a mongoose, two Spix's macaws, an entire herd of African elephants, Rock Hyraxes, and several giant tortoises.

While on their travels they also meet many animals that don't board the island such as an Indian water-buffalo, a dromedary camel, sea-turtles, some species of butterflies, wildebeests, a sea-lion, a wild cat, dugongs, a great white shark, Indian cobras, budgerigars,  and a community of kakapos.

Residents of Diamantina
 Queen Abront – the primary villain of the third series. She is a giant, prehistoric frog who rules over Diamantina as a "Queen" and a "Mother". She is a traditionalist with a prejudice towards any modern species, who she refers to as "Un-Froggables" and sees them as lacking respect for ancient ways; especially humans who she sees as all intelligence and no soul. However, she warms up to Reg and Rita who she comes to see as her children. On the final episode, she makes peace with Noah and trusts him to look after her frogspawn after Diamantina's destruction.
 Galeo – another giant frog and servant of Queen Abront.
 Morris – another servant of Queen Abront. Despite being loyal to Abront, he is friendly and kind-hearted, and does not see the "Un-Froggables" as a serious threat. He is also the smallest of the frogs, being closer in size to Sacha.
 Gorm – Salomi's father, he is an ancient mammoth who painted the map to Diamantia that Noah and the animals follow, and has lived on Diamantina peacefully since the ice age. Like Abront, he is defensive over Diamantina and sees Noah and the other animals as invaders who threaten to disrupt his tranquil life style. He and Mammothsbody have a bit a rivalry over leader of the herd despite them along with Salomi are the only three mammoths in the island. Eventually, he makes peace with Noah and joins the island when it leaves the ruins of Diamantina.

List of episodes

Season 1

Season 2

Season 3

Cast
 Ron Moody – Noah the Polar Bear, Rocco the Gorilla, Reg the Mandrill, Squadron Leader the Vulture, Additional Voices
 Sally Grace – Woomera the Kangaroo, Additional Voices
 Jon Glover – Mammothsbody the Woolly Mammoth, Imm the Vulture, Additional Voices
 David Holt – Sacha the Desman, Additional Voices
 Jill Shilling – Ursula the Brown Bear, Salomi the Woolly Mammoth, Additional Voices
 Melissa Sinden – Chang the Giant Panda, Agatha the Giraffe, Additional Voices
 Jeremy Barrett – Elderly Dugong, Additional Voices
 Rupert Farley – Circus Sea Lion, Wommie the Wombat, Chip the Wallaby, Bandicoot, Additional Voices

See also
 European Broadcasting Union
 List of BBC children's television programmes

References

External links
 
 Official EBU Website
 Eurovision Children and Youth Television Programmes
 Steve Walker's Biography & CV

1997 British television series debuts
1999 British television series endings
1990s British children's television series
BBC children's television shows
1990s British animated television series
British children's animated adventure television series
Noah's Ark in television
Animated television series about bears
Television series set on fictional islands